The General Confederation of Labor (Spanish: Confederación General del Trabajo, CGT) is a Spanish trade union federation.

The CGT was a result of a split in the anarchist National Confederation of Labor (CNT). In 1979, at the first CNT congress after Spain's transition to democracy, there was a fundamental disagreement concerning union elections. Such elections allow Spanish workers to elect union delegates to factory committees every four years. Some deemed this a renewal of anarcho-syndicalism, but the more orthodox in the organization considered such elections a "government intervention in labor–capital relations". Moreover, this would involve receiving state funding. The two factions split and there were two CNTs. They fought over ownership of the name CNT. In 1989, the orthodox CNT prevailed in court and the renovators took the name CGT.

The CGT has since participated in union elections since 1989, receiving the fourth most votes behind CCOO, the UGT, and the CSIF. It has 100,000 members, as of 2018.

References

Sources

External links
Official website

National trade union centers of Spain
Syndicalism
Anarchist organisations in Spain
Trade unions established in 1979
Syndicalist trade unions